The 2017 Belo PSL Beach Volleyball Challenge Cup was the second tournament of the Philippine Superliga for its fifth season. The conference ran from May 4 to 7, 2017 at The Sands, SM By The Bay (SM Mall of Asia).

Women's Division

Preliminary round

Pool A

|}

|}

Pool B

|}

|}

Pool C

|}

|}

Pool D

|}

|}

Playoffs

Quarterfinals

|}

|}

For 7th place

|}

For 5th place

|}

Semi-finals

|}

For 3rd place

|}

Women's Finals

|}

Final standing

Men's Division

Preliminary round

Pool A

|}

|}

Pool B

|}

|}

Playoffs

Semi-finals

|}

For 3rd place

|}

Men's Finals

|}

Final standing

Celebrity match

Team Ara (ARA):
 Ara Galang
 Dianne Medina
 Almira Teng
 Nikko Huelgas

Team Den (DEN):
 Denden Lazaro
 RR Enriquez
 Amanda Fernandez
 Mich del Carmen

Team Kim (KIM):
 Kim Fajardo
 Aubrey Miles
 Jacq Yu
 Mark Neumann

Team Rachel (RAD):
 Rachel Anne Daquis
 Karla Aguas
 Jeck Dionela
 Malak So

|}

Venue
 The Sands (SM By The Bay, SM Mall of Asia)

Broadcast partners
 TV5, AksyonTV, Sports5.ph

References

Philippine Super Liga
Beach volleyball competitions in the Philippines
PSL
PSL